The 2018 African Men's Junior Handball Championship was held in Marrakesh, Morocco from 7 to 14 September 2018 at the Prince Moulay Rachid Hall. The top three teams qualified for the 2019 Men's Junior World Handball Championship.

Results
All times are local (UTC+1).

References

Men's Junior Handball Championship
African Men's Junior Handball Championship
African Men's Junior Handball Championship
African Men's Junior Handball Championship
Junior
African Men's Junior Handball Championship